Demetrios "Demetri" Dollis (born 19 May 1956 in Argos Orestiko) is a former Australian politician of Greek descent and a former Deputy Minister for Foreign Affairs of Greece under the Cabinets of George Papandreou and Coalition Cabinet of Lucas Papademos. He was a Labor member for Richmond in the Victorian Legislative Assembly from 1988 to 1999, and Victorian Deputy Leader of the Opposition from 1994 to 1997.

Career 
Dollis was elected at the 1988 Victorian State election. 
In 1994, Dollis, who was from the Left faction, was elected deputy leader of the ALP as part of a factional deal that saved ALP leader John Brumby from being ousted in an attempted leadership coup.

In 1999, Dollis was disendorsed by the ALP in light of his time spent abroad. Dollis had become involved in helping to free Australian CARE workers imprisoned in Yugoslavia, and was unable to respond to allegations he was seeking a job from the Greek government.

Following his departure from Victorian politics, Dollis took up roles on Greek diplomatic circuit. In 2010 Dollis was appointed as a Greek Deputy Minister for Foreign Affairs alongside Mariliza Xenogiannakopoulou, a role held until June 2012 when the Coalition Cabinet of Antonis Samaras was sworn in.

References
Notes

Citations

External links
Demetri Dollis at re-member

1956 births
Living people
Australian Labor Party members of the Parliament of Victoria
Members of the Victorian Legislative Assembly
Greek emigrants to Australia
Government ministers of Greece
People from Argos Orestiko